"If I Told You" is a song written by Ross Copperman along with Shane McAnally and Jon Nite, and recorded by American country music artist Darius Rucker. It was released on July 5, 2016 as the lead single from his fifth country studio album, When Was the Last Time, which was released on October 20, 2017.

Commercial performance
The song debuted at No. 46 on the Hot Country Songs chart on the chart dated July 16, 2016. It also debuted at No. 43 on the Country Airplay chart. The song reached No. 1 on the Country Airplay chart for the week of June 24, 2017, making it Rucker's first since "Wagon Wheel" in 2013. It sold 31,000 copies in its first full week on sale. The song has sold 359,000 copies in the United States as of July 2017.

Charts

Year-end charts

Certifications

References

2016 songs
2016 singles
Country ballads
2010s ballads
Darius Rucker songs
Songs written by Ross Copperman
Songs written by Shane McAnally
Songs written by Jon Nite
Capitol Records Nashville singles
Song recordings produced by Frank Rogers (record producer)
Song recordings produced by Ross Copperman